Ardmore comes from the  or the  meaning "great height" and  may refer to:

Places

Canada
Ardmore, Alberta
Ardmore, a neighbourhood in North Saanich, British Columbia
Ardmore Beach, a community in Tiny, Ontario

Republic of Ireland
Ardmore, County Waterford, a seaside resort and fishing village
Ardmore, County Westmeath, a townland in Mullingar civil parish

New Zealand
Ardmore, New Zealand

United Kingdom
Ardmore, County Antrim, Northern Ireland
Ardmore, County Fermanagh, a townland in County Fermanagh, Northern Ireland
Ardmore, County Londonderry, Northern Ireland
Ardmore, County Tyrone, a townland of County Tyrone, Northern Ireland
Ardmore, Barra, Outer Hebrides, Scotland
Ardmore, Easter Ross, Highland, Scotland

United States
Ardmore, Alabama
Ardmore (Atlanta), Georgia
Ardmore, Indiana
Ardmore, Maryland
Ardmore, Missouri
Ardmore Historic District in Winston-Salem, North Carolina
Ardmore, Oklahoma
Ardmore Historic Commercial District
Ardmore, Pennsylvania
Ardmore, South Dakota
Ardmore, Tennessee

Transportation
Ardmore railway station, a former railway station in Ardmore, County Londonderry, Northern Ireland, U.K.
Ardmore Avenue Train Station, a former train station in Villa Park, Illinois
Ardmore station (Oklahoma), an Amtrak station in Ardmore, Oklahoma
Ardmore station (Pennsylvania), an Amtrak and SEPTA station in Ardmore, Pennsylvania
Ardmore Avenue (SEPTA station), a SEPTA station in Ardmore, Pennsylvania
Ardmore Junction (SEPTA station), a SEPTA station in Ardmore, Pennsylvania
Pennsylvania Route 8, known as Ardmore Boulevard

Other uses
 Bishop of Ardmore, a bishopric in Ardmore, County Waterford
 Ardmore Airport (New Zealand), Auckland, New Zealand
 Ardmore distillery
 Ardmore Studios, a film studio in County Wicklow, Republic of Ireland